WAKC (102.3 FM) is an American licensed radio station in Concord, New Hampshire. The station is owned by the Educational Media Foundation and is part of its K-Love network of contemporary Christian music outlets.

History

Early years
The station began operations March 7, 1972 as WKXL-FM, the FM sister station to WKXL (1450 AM), under the ownership of Frank Estes, who also owned WKXR in Exeter, New Hampshire. In 1980, Estes sold the WKXL stations to a group of station employees.

The Music Zone
The 102.3 FM signal was largely a repeater of the 1450 AM news-talk broadcast until 1986 when the owners launched a "light alternative" adult album alternative format.  The format was led by Program Director Renee Blake, Production Director Taft Moore, on-air talent including Dave Doud, Julia Figueras, Norm Beeker, and Jay Dreves, and featured artists such as The Cure, Poi Dog Pondering, 10,000 Maniacs, The Pixies, The Call, and U2.  The station won recognition, Best of the Best, in 1990 from the National Association of Broadcasters for community service with their This Island Earth promotion that focused on environmental awareness with on-air and "in-field" activities.   The Music Zone format continued until 1991 when financial pressures returned the FM signal to a simulcast of the AM broadcast.

"Outlaw" country
In 1999, the employee group sold the WKXL stations to Vox Media, who, after buying WRCI (107.7 FM) in nearby Hillsborough several months later, shifted the simulcast to that station; as a result, on January 3, 2000, the station returned to separate programming as a country station, WOTX-FM ("Outlaw Country").

"The Hawk"
In 2004, Vox sold most of its stations in the area to Nassau Broadcasting Partners; however, Nassau could not buy WOTX outright due to Federal Communications Commission (FCC) ownership restrictions. Nassau did take control of the station under a local marketing agreement, and on February 7, 2005 swapped formats with WNHI (93.3 FM) and became a classic rock station as WWHK ("102.3 The Hawk"), in tandem with a nearby Nassau classic rock station, WWHQ (101.5 FM) in Meredith, New Hampshire.

WWHK had planned to drop the classic rock format in favor of sports talk provided by Boston's WEEI in January 2008, but the deal between Nassau and Entercom ended up collapsing. In March 2008, the station shifted from classic rock to a more mainstream rock format.

Ownership limbo
In September 2006, the FCC ruled that local marketing agreements and joint sales agreements counted towards the operator's ownership count in a market. Initially, Nassau continued to operate WWHK in violation of this ruling as it attempted to obtain a waiver to buy WWHK outright, but the FCC ruled in April 2008 that Nassau had worked with Arbitron to create a Concord radio market, and barred its purchase of WWHK. Four months later, the FCC ordered Nassau to terminate the joint sales agreement with Capitol Broadcasting (the Vox Media subsidiary that continued to hold the WWHK license while Nassau ran the station). Nassau complied, and on August 22, 2008, Vox reassumed control of the station with a commercial-free rock format. The station switched to classical music in September 2008; soon afterwards, the station went silent.

Vox reached a deal to sell WWHK to Andrew Sumereau in 2009. In the interim, Vox returned the station to the air in July, again airing a classic rock loop. In April 2010, the station began simulcasting WTPL (the former WRCI and second WKXL-FM). The sale to Sumereau's company, Birch Broadcasting, was finally completed on June 22, 2011; a week earlier, Vox temporarily signed WWHK off once more. Birch returned the station to the air on June 15, 2012 (after an earlier return on June 8 was ended three days later due to the station's tower not being grounded to safely handle lightning strikes). For nearly two years, 24 hours a day, the station aired rock songs performed in classical style by the group known as the Vitamin String Quartet,

A "River" in Concord
In early 2014, Steven Silberberg's Northeast Broadcasting reached a deal to purchase WWHK from Birch Broadcasting. Northeast took control of the station through a local marketing agreement on April 1; soon thereafter, WWHK began broadcasting commercial-free selections from Andover, Massachusetts sister station WXRV's "River Music Hall" performances. On May 2, 2014, WWHK began simulcasting WXRV. However, the station broadcasts separate news, weather, and advertising. WXRV's programming was already available in portions of the Concord-Lakes Region market through WLKC (105.7 FM) in Campton; WWHK is located between the coverage areas of WXRV and WLKC. The sale to licensee Devon Broadcasting Company, Inc., at a price of $425,000, was consummated on June 19, 2014. On March 28, 2016, WWHK changed its call letters to WXRG.

The Educational Media Foundation acquired WXRG and WLKC from Devon Broadcasting Corporation in 2020, as part of its sale of three New Hampshire FMs to the Christian broadcaster. The call letters in Concord changed to WAKC on January 6, 2021, coincident with the consummation of the sale.

WLKC
WLKC (105.7 FM), licensed to Campton, New Hampshire has simulcast WXRV since 1999. For a brief time during 2012–13, the station was programmed separately (though retaining the "River" branding and AAA format), before returning to the WXRV simulcast. In 2014, Northeast Broadcasting acquired a second New Hampshire station, WWHK (102.3 FM) in Concord; that station began broadcasting WXRV programming on May 2, 2014, though WWHK broadcast separate news, weather, and advertising. Later that month, WXRV added a translator in Needham, Massachusetts, W243DC (96.5 FM).

References

External links

AKC
Concord, New Hampshire
Radio stations established in 1972
1972 establishments in New Hampshire
Educational Media Foundation radio stations
K-Love radio stations